Jabulani Ali Linje (born 7 November 1994) is a Malawian footballer who played as a forward for J3 League side YSCC Yokohama.

Career statistics

Club

Notes

International

References

External links

1994 births
Living people
Malawian footballers
Malawian expatriate footballers
Expatriate footballers in Japan
Association football midfielders
YSCC Yokohama players
J3 League players
Malawian expatriate sportspeople in Japan
Civo United FC players
Kamuzu Barracks FC players
Mighty Wanderers FC players
Malawi international footballers
People from Lilongwe